Stella is a 1955 Greek film is a retelling of Carmen featuring Melina Mercouri. The film was directed by the Greek Cypriot Michael Cacoyannis and written by Cacoyannis and Iakovos Kambanelis.  The music was composed by Manos Hadjidakis and Vassilis Tsitsanis.

Stella was originally intended to be a stage play with the title Stella with the Red Gloves, but it was never staged. It has been claimed that this story was the perfect vehicle for the thirty-five-year-old Mercouri's film debut. Indeed, it was the hit that Melina Mercouri needed. The film sparked great controversy, and although it was initially rejected by Greek critics, it is now considered one of the five greatest Greek films.

At the 1955 Cannes Film Festival, where the film was screened, Melina met Jules Dassin, her future husband, mentor, and director. He helped her to secure major roles in such films as Topkapi, Never on Sunday, Phaedra, and 10:30 P.M. Summer, which  became major international successes.

Plot
The story of a fiercely independent and uncompromising young woman. Stella, a rembetiko singer at Paradise nightclub, lives a guiltless, turbulent life. Her innate independence and assertive nature lead her to numerous passionate love affairs. While with Aleko, son of a wealthy family, she decides, as is her habit, to break up before the relationship wears off. Once she meets Miltos, a young soccer player, she seems to change. At first, she avoids his advances, but, later, gives in to him. However, she can only be with him on her own terms. No matter how much she loves him, she mostly values her freedom. Things turn complicated when she is called to choose. She repeatedly rejects Miltos marriage proposals. When Miltos finally forces her to accept the idea of marriage, Stella does not appear in church, despite Miltos repeatedly warning her that he will kill her if she doesn't marry him.  Miltos kills her with a dagger at end of the film.

It has been said that the story of Stella's forced marriage symbolises the forces that are constantly trying to impose their will on Greece.

Cast
 Melina Mercouri as Stella
 Giorgos Fountas as Miltos
 Alekos Alexandrakis as Alekos
 Christina Kalogerikou as Miltos' Mother
 Voula Zouboulaki as Anetta
 Dionysis Papagiannopoulos as Mitsos
 Sofia Vembo as Maria
 Costas Kakavas as Antonis (as Kostas Karalis)
 Tasso Kavadia as Alekos' Sister
 Michael Cacoyannis as Wedding guest

References

External links 
 

1955 films
1950s Greek-language films
1955 drama films
1950s feminist films
Films directed by Michael Cacoyannis
Films set in Greece
Films shot in Athens
Films scored by Manos Hatzidakis
Greek drama films
Greek black-and-white films